Mount Enon Church and Cemetery is a historic church in Mitchell County, Georgia near Baconton.  It is a one-story wood frame country church built in 1889 on a brick pier foundation.

It was added to the National Register in 1983, and then was the third-oldest church in the county.

It served the community of Gum Pond, which had population 400 at one point, until the community, which could not compete with Baconton, disappeared; the church is the only remaining building of that community and ceased services in 1928. In the era of its National Register listing, it was the center for an annual commemorative event by descendants of the congregation.

References

External links
 

Churches in Georgia (U.S. state)
Churches on the National Register of Historic Places in Georgia (U.S. state)
Churches completed in 1857
19th-century churches in the United States
Buildings and structures in Mitchell County, Georgia
Cemeteries on the National Register of Historic Places in Georgia (U.S. state)
National Register of Historic Places in Mitchell County, Georgia
1857 establishments in Georgia (U.S. state)